Justin Booty (born 2 June 1976) is an English former footballer who played as a forward in the Football League for Colchester United.

Career

Born in Colchester, Booty began his playing career with hometown club Colchester United. During his time in the Colchester youth team, he scored a double hat-trick in 1992, only the third under-18 player to achieve this feat. After impressing at youth level, he made his first-team debut on 11 January 1994 in a 1–0 home defeat to Wycombe Wanderers in the Associate Members' Cup.

His first and only appearance in the Football League came four days later on 15 January in a 1–0 home victory over Hereford United, coming on as a substitute for Grant Watts. Following his exit from Colchester, Booty joined Braintree Town and later Wivenhoe Town.

References

External links
 

1976 births
Living people
Sportspeople from Colchester
English footballers
Association football forwards
Colchester United F.C. players
Braintree Town F.C. players
Wivenhoe Town F.C. players
English Football League players